Neghelli may refer to:
Negele Borana, a town in southern Ethiopia
Italian submarine Neghelli